Ishiwara is a Japanese surname. Notable people with the surname include:

, Japanese theoretical physicist
, Japanese general

See also
Ishiwara Station, a railway station in Kumagaya, Saitama Prefecture, Japan
Ishihara

Japanese-language surnames